Auxilium Pallacanestro Torino history and statistics in FIBA Europe and Euroleague Basketball (company) competitions.

European competitions

Record
Auxilium Pallacanestro Torino has overall, from 1975–76 (first participation) to 1986–87 (last participation): 18 wins against 11 defeats plus 1 draw in 30 games for all the European club competitions.

 EuroLeague: –
 EuroCup 6-4 (10)
 FIBA Saporta Cup: –
 FIBA Korać Cup: 18–11 plus 1 draw (30)

External links
FIBA Europe
Euroleague
ULEB
Eurocup

References

Basketball teams in Piedmont
Sport in Turin